Viola sororia, known commonly as the common blue violet, is a short-stemmed herbaceous  perennial plant that is native to eastern North America. It is known by a number of common names, including common meadow violet, purple violet, woolly blue violet, hooded violet, and wood violet. Its cultivar 'Albiflora' has gained the Royal Horticultural Society's Award of Garden Merit. This perennial plant species is distributed in the eastern half of the United States, Canada and a part of Eastern Mexico. Their native habitats are rich, moist woods, and swamps located in the eastern half of the United States and Canada. 
 
Self-seeding freely, in lawns and gardens it can be considered a weed by some. Cleistogamous seed heads may also appear on short stems in late summer and early autumn.

Description 

Viola sororia is a short-stemmed, herbaceous perennial plant that grows in well-drained and shady habitats. This 6-10 inch wide violet has glossy, heart-shaped leaves and are topped with purple flowers with white throats. The lower three petals are hairy and the  stem of the flower droops slightly. These flowers can be found in the woods, thickets, and near stream beds. This plant species can live and reproduce for over more than 10 years. Blooming in the Spring-Summer, or the months of April–August, Viola sororia can be found in colors of white, blue, or even purple.

Phonetic pronunciation 
The most common way to pronounce Viola sororia is "vy-OH-la so-ROR-ee-uh".

Taxonomy
Hairless common blue violets with purple flowers and bearded spurred petals have been variously called Viola sororia, Viola affinis, and Viola pratincola. In the Chicago region, this hairless form is most frequently found in weedy areas such as old fields and lawns. Hairy purple violets with blue flowers have been called "true" Viola sororia and are rarely seen outside of remnant wooded areas.

A form with white flowers that have a purple center has been called Viola sororia fo. priceana (Confederate violet).

Viola sororia has several named hybrids:
Viola × bernardii (Viola pedaifida var. pedatifida × sororia)
Viola × bissellii (Viola cucullata × sororia)
Viola × cordifolia (Viola hirsutula × sororia) 
Viola × conjugens (Viola sagittata var. sagittata × sororia)
Viola × insolita (Viola pedatifida var. brittoniana × sororia)

Distribution and habitat 
Viola sororia are primarily found in forests and are interfertile, meaning they are likely and able to breed with other closely related species. The species grows on the forest floor and environment can adapt to sunny or partly shady conditions. The leaves on the Viola sororia develop in the early spring when the surrounding tree crowns are not fully closed. Still, when the canopy closes, the leaves continue to grow and develop. Soils preferred by V. sororia are moist, rich, and well drained.

Uses
Beyond its use as a common lawn and garden plant, Viola sororia has historically been used for food and for medicine. The flowers and leaves are edible, and some sources suggest the roots can also be eaten. The Cherokee used it to treat colds and headaches. Rafinesque, in his Medical Flora, a Manual of the Medical Botany of the United States of North America (1828–1830), wrote of Viola sororia being used by his American contemporaries for coughs, sore throats, and constipation.

The leaves are high in vitamins A and C and can be eaten raw. The flowers have been made into jelly and candy.

Viola sororia can also be used to decorate walkways and park areas. It is used as a wildflower in lawns, though some consider Viola sororia a weed, despite being a resource for pollinators. Viola sororia are also very high in vitamins A and C, which means they can be used in salads, cooked as greens, or even made into candies and jellies. The young leaves and flower buds can be eaten raw or cooked, or brewed for a tea. Viola sororia may also work as an anti-inflammatory and used topically for skin conditions.Viola sororia is deer resistant.

Ecology
The caterpillars of fritillary butterflies, such as the great spangled fritillary and variegated fritillary, are dependent on these and other plants in genus Viola. The plants also serve as food for wild turkeys, rabbits, deer, livestock, the mourning dove, the bobwhite, and the white-footed mouse.

Native bees such as the Mason Bees, Halictid Bees,and the violet specialist Mining Bee, visit the Viola sororia plant for its nectar in the spring time. Butterflies are also known to pollinate from this species. These pollinated flowers result in a normal seed distribution like most flowering plants; however, Viola sororia produce seeds in the late summer from a process called cleistogamy. This means that it self-fertilizes inside the plant, without opening. The seed capsules eventually turn upright, opens, and shoots out their seeds as far as 9 feet away from the plant.

Violets employ myrmecochory, which is the process of the seeds being dispersed by ants. The seeds are coated with protein- and lipid-rich morsels, also known as elaiosomes, and they attract ants. The ants then gather the seeds and bring them back to their nests. When the coating is consumed by the ants, it is discarded into their waste piles, which is actually just planting the seeds. Although they have no known toxicities, when it comes to fire ecology, they are not fire resistant, and their fire tolerance is low. They have no serious insect or disease problems and their foliage usually declines in hot summers. Myrmecochory, is a form of mutualism between the Viola sororia plant species and a certain ant species. The diaspores have elaiosomes that attract ants and lead to the dispersal of the diaspores. The appendages are nutrient-rich, which induces some ant species to carry the diaspores from the plant, back to their nest. The elaiosome is consumed and the germinable seed is discarded. Ants can increase the dispersal distance by moving diaspore away from the parent plant, move them from other competitors and predators, and relocate them to favorable sites for germination. Within the ant nest, seeds may be protected from fire and seed predators, which is beneficial for the Viola sororia plant, considering they are not fire resistant.

Toxicity 
Viola sororia leaves and flowers are edible in moderation and also safe to plant around pets.

Lawn weed 
Viola sororia is known as a wild violet that may be hard to control due to its sometime weedy nature. Halauxifen-methyl, has shown promising results on hard-to-control weeds, including Viola sororia.

Cultural significance
It is the state flower of Illinois, Rhode Island, New Jersey, and Wisconsin. The genus, Viola, is known as a symbol of love and modesty by poets from Sappho to Shakespeare to Christina Rossetti. In the 1930s, a Broadway play featured a lesbian character that won over the lady she was in love with, with violets. This inspired a violet fad and was the reason why violets may also be known as "the lesbian flower".

Gallery

References

Bibliography 

 
 
 
 Viola sororia from the Virginia Tech Weed Identification Guide
 Duke, James. 1992. Handbook of Edible Weeds. CRC Press, Boca Raton, Florida.
  Viola sororia: University of Wisconsin-La Crosse

External links
 Flora of Pennsylvania

sororia
Symbols of Illinois
Symbols of New Jersey
Symbols of Rhode Island
Symbols of Wisconsin
Flora of North America
Plants used in traditional Native American medicine
Invasive plant species in Japan